Carrie is a 1952 romance film based on the novel Sister Carrie by Theodore Dreiser.

Directed by William Wyler, the film stars Jennifer Jones in the title role and Laurence Olivier as Hurstwood. Eddie Albert played Charles Drouet. Carrie received two Academy Award nominations: Costume Design (Edith Head), and Best Art Direction (Hal Pereira, Roland Anderson, Emile Kuri).

Plot

Around the turn of the century, Carrie Meeber (Jennifer Jones) leaves her family in a small rural town and heads to Chicago. On the train to Chicago, Charles Drouet (Eddie Albert) approaches her. Although Carrie is reluctant to speak to him, the salesman persists and the two chat until they reach Chicago. Carrie gets off in South Chicago, the slums as Charles Drouet points out, after taking Drouet's business card.

In South Chicago, Carrie stays with her sister and her husband Sven who have one child. Carrie loses her sweatshop sewing job after injuring her hand. After an exhausting and fruitless day of job hunting, Carrie looks up Charles Drouet. He not only talks her into having dinner with him at Fitzgerald's, an upscale restaurant, but also gives her $10.

Carrie heads to Fitzgerald's to return the money to Drouet. While there she meets George Hurstwood (Laurence Olivier), the manager of the restaurant, who is immediately smitten with her.

Carrie ends up moving in with Drouet. He is a big talker but basically harmless. She pressures Drouet to marry her because the neighbors are talking about them. He tries to distract her and invites Hurstwood, whom he had run into by sheer coincidence, into their home. With Drouet's permission, Hurstwood takes Carrie to the theater while Drouet is on one of his many business trips. Hurstwood and Carrie end up spending every free minute together, and the two fall in love. Just before she is about to run off with Hurstwood, she finds out that he is married. She is distraught and confronts Hurstwood, who admits that he is married although terribly unhappy.

At the restaurant, Hurstwood cashes up for the night and, by accidentally locking a timed safe, finds himself stuck with $10,000 of his boss's money. He goes home with the money and is initially pleased to find his boss there. He tries to give the money to his boss, but when he learns that his boss intends to give his salary directly to Hurstwood's wife because of his relationship with Carrie, he decides to take the money to run away with Carrie. He leaves an I-O-U intent on paying his boss back as soon as he made it on his own feet.

He coaxes Carrie, who initially refuses to see him, out of the house by telling her that Drouet had injured himself and that he would take her to see him. On the train to Drouet, Hurstwood tells her that he loves her and that he wants to be with her, asking her to leave Drouet. Carrie is torn, but does love Hurstwood, so she decides to stay with him.

The first few days are blissful, but then reality catches up with them. Hurstwood's boss sends an officer from the bond company after Hurstwood to collect the money Hurstwood took. Hurstwood, who has already been looking for work, finds out quickly that word of his stealing the money has gotten around. Unable to find a job, Hurstwood and Carrie soon find themselves living in poverty.

When Carrie finds out that she is pregnant, the two think that things might take a turn for the better. But Hurstwood's wife shows up, wanting his signature and his agreement to sell the house they own jointly. Hurstwood wants his share of the proceeds but she says she will press charges against him for bigamy if he insists. Carrie is devastated. Hurstwood's wife refused to consent to a divorce and Hurstwood didn't know how to tell Carrie.

Hurstwood tells his wife he will sign and will not ask for money if she'll grant him a divorce. She does, but it is too late. Carrie loses the baby and decides to try her luck at acting. Hurstwood reads in the newspaper that his son is due in New York after his honeymoon and decides to see him at the docks. While he is there, Carrie leaves him (even though she still loves him) because she thinks he will use this opportunity to re-enter his family's life.

While Hurstwood drifts further and further into poverty and ends up living on the streets, Carrie's star in the theatre rises until she is a well-regarded actress on the cusp of fame.

Hurstwood, entirely starved, visits her at the theatre stage door, and she wants to take him back. She had found out from Drouet that Hurstwood had taken the money to start a life with her and blames herself for his predicament. She wants to make it up to Hurstwood but he won't take more than a quarter and disappears after toying with the gas burner in her dressing room.

Cast
Laurence Olivier as George Hurstwood
Jennifer Jones as Carrie Meeber
Miriam Hopkins as Julie Hurstwood
Eddie Albert as Charles Drouet
Ray Teal as Allen
Barry Kelley as Slawson
William Reynolds as George Hurstwood, Jr.
Mary Murphy as Jessica Hurstwood
Basil Ruysdael as Mr. Fitzgerald
Walter Baldwin as Carrie's father
Dorothy Adams as Carrie's mother
Melinda Plowman as the next-door neighbour and friend

Production
Wyler was reluctant to cast Jones, but Jones's husband David O. Selznick pushed hard for her to be given the role. The filming was plagued by a variety of troubles: Jones had not revealed that she was pregnant; Wyler was mourning the death of his year-old son; Olivier had a painful leg ailment that made him cranky, and he developed a dislike for Jones; and Hollywood was reeling under the effects of McCarthyism, and the studio was afraid to distribute a film that could be attacked as immoral. Ultimately, the ending was changed to eliminate Hurstwood's suicide and the film was cut to make it more positive in tone. Some critics accused the film of sentimentalizing the novel, box office was weak, and reviews were generally disappointing, although they praised Olivier, who received a BAFTA nomination. Later critics also praised Albert's performance, but most agreed that Jones' was weak. Wyler eventually admitted that the film was too depressing during a time when American audiences wanted escapist entertainment to take their minds off the Cold War.

The film was screened as part of the 13th Venice Film Festival official program.

Accolades
The film is recognized by American Film Institute in these lists:
 2002: AFI's 100 Years...100 Passions – Nominated

References

External links

 

1952 films
American black-and-white films
Films based on American novels
Films directed by William Wyler
Films scored by David Raksin
Films set in Chicago
Films set in the 1900s
American historical drama films
1950s historical drama films
Paramount Pictures films
Films based on works by Theodore Dreiser
1952 drama films
1950s English-language films
1950s American films